The Desperate Trail is a 1994 American Western film written and directed  by P. J. Pesce and starring  Sam Elliott, Craig Sheffer and Linda Fiorentino.  It was originally shown on the TNT cable TV network.

Plot
On a stagecoach in the old West, Marshall Bill Speakes (Sam Elliott) is escorting his prisoner Sarah O'Rourke (Linda Fiorentino) to her hanging.  Also in the stage are Jack Cooper (Craig Sheffer), Mamie Hollister (Robin Westphal), and her husband Zeb Hollister (John Furlong).  The stage is attacked by three highwaymen (Boots Southerland, Daniel O'Haco, and Joey Hamlin).  The stage runs over one, but the driver is killed by the leader and the stage takes off.  The Marshall handcuffs Sarah to the stage and gains control of it.  One of the bandits climbs onto the back.  Sarah grabs his gun and she and the Marshall shoot him. The Marshall finally shoots kills the leader. Sarah then surprises the Marshall and takes his gun.  The strongbox is opened and Sarah prepares to take off with the cash, but Jack wrestles her gun away and runs off with the cash himself.

Jack heads to a nearby town and takes a hooker up to his room.  Some time later, Sarah drops by and gets the drop on him. She escorts him to the lobby to get the money from the safe, but they are both surprised by the Marshall and Mr. Hollister. In the shootout, they both escape.

Jack talks Sarah into a scheme to rob a bank.  They get some cash from a poker game after Sarah shoots most of the other players.  Meanwhile, the Marshall gathers a posse and heads after them. The posse catches up to them in another town.  During a shootout, Jack is wounded and is rescued by Sarah.  They ride off.  Hollister has been shot and is acting incoherently, so the Marshall kills him, showing his dark side.

Jack and Sarah get chummy.  She reveals that the person she was to be hanged for killing was actually the Marshall's son, who had beaten her.  They travel to the ranch of Jack's brother, Walter (Frank Whaley).  Jack and Sarah fight, and she takes off but is captured by the posse and taken to town for hanging.  Walter spots her there and tells Jack.  They come up with a plan to rescue her.  Meanwhile, the Marshall shows more of his bad side by mentally torturing Sarah in her cell.

Jack goes to town and gets captured intentionally.  He is put into the jail with Sarah.  Using some chemicals given to him by Walter, he breaks out of his cell and he and Sarah take off.  They hide in a large crate in the shipping office. Walter picks up the crate the next day and gets them back to the ranch.

While Jack and Sarah are out, the posse comes to the ranch and starts to torture Walter.  Jack breaks in and shoots some of the posse.  In an involved shootout, all of the posse except the Marshall are killed.  The Marshall kills Walter, then wounds Jack.  Sarah distracts the Marshall and Jack shoots and kills him. Jack and Sarah ride off.

Cast 
  Sam Elliott as Marshall Bill Speakes
  Craig Sheffer as Jack Cooper
  Linda Fiorentino as Sarah O'Rourke
  Frank Whaley as Walter Cooper
  John Furlong as Zeb Hollister
  Robin Westphal as Mamie Hollister
  Boots Southerland as Scar Face Leader
  Joey Hamlin as Laughing Boy Killer
  Danny O'Haco as Happy
  Bradley Whitford as Tommy Donnelly
  Jill Scott Momaday as Janie 
  P. J. Pesce as Scared Mustachioed Cowboy

References

External links

 

1994 films
1994 Western (genre) films
American Western (genre) films
1990s English-language films
Films directed by P. J. Pesce
1990s American films